Pristimantis schultei is a species of frog in the family Strabomantidae.
It is found in Ecuador and Peru.
Its natural habitats are tropical moist montane forests and heavily degraded former forest.
It is threatened by habitat loss.

References

schultei
Amphibians of Ecuador
Amphibians of Peru
Amphibians of the Andes
Amphibians described in 1990
Taxonomy articles created by Polbot